NGC 817 is a spiral galaxy in the constellation Aries.

References

External links
 

Spiral galaxies
Aries (constellation)
817
008109